Mizanur Rahman Minu is a Bangladesh Nationalist Party politician and the former Mayor and Member of Parliament of Rajshahi-2.

Career
Minu was elected to parliament from Rajshahi-2 as a Bangladesh Nationalist Party candidate in 2001. He has served as the Mayor of Rajshahi. He was elected president of Rajshahi unit of Bangladesh Nationalist Party. He is an advisor to former Prime Minister and Chairperson of Bangladesh Nationalist Party, Khaleda Zia.

References

Bangladesh Nationalist Party politicians
Living people
8th Jatiya Sangsad members
Year of birth missing (living people)